The Marquette and Western Railroad Negaunee Freight Depot is a railroad depot located at 420 Rail Street in Negaunee, Michigan.  It is also known as the Duluth, South Shore and Atlantic Negaunee Freight Depot.  It was listed on the National Register of Historic Places in 2008.

History 

The original Negaunee depot burned in 1879.  This Negaunee depot was built in 1884 by the Marquette and Western Railroad as a freight and passenger depot.  After only a year of service, the entire line was bought by a competitor, the Marquette, Houghton and Ontonagon Railroad.  The structure was used as the main freight and passenger depot in Negaunee until it was replaced with a newer structure in 1922.  In 1912 it was moved a short distance across the railroad tracks to the location it now stands.  The structure was used by the Duluth, South Shore and Atlantic Railway as offices, warehouse space, and a freight depot until 1965.  The station has recently been converted into an artist's studio.

Description 
The depot is a one-story rectangular frame structure. It has Swiss-inspired vertical board and batten siding, gable and under-eaves trim, along with bracketing and scalloped bottom.  The Stick Style depot is largely intact, and reflects Negaunee's growth in the late 19th century due to the iron mining industry.

See also

References

Buildings and structures in Marquette County, Michigan
Railway stations on the National Register of Historic Places in Michigan
Railway freight houses on the National Register of Historic Places
Queen Anne architecture in Michigan
Railway stations in the United States opened in 1884
Railway stations closed in 1965
1884 establishments in Michigan
1965 disestablishments in Michigan
National Register of Historic Places in Marquette County, Michigan
Railway buildings and structures on the National Register of Historic Places in Michigan
Former railway stations in Michigan